Kosmos 487 ( meaning Cosmos 487), known before launch as DS-P1-Yu No.57, was a Soviet satellite which was launched in 1972 as part of the Dnepropetrovsk Sputnik programme. It was a  spacecraft, which was built by the Yuzhnoye Design Bureau, and was used as a radar calibration target for anti-ballistic missile tests.

Kosmos 487 was successfully launched into low Earth orbit at 11:59:59 UTC on 21 April 1972. The launch took place from Site 133/1 at the Plesetsk Cosmodrome, and used a Kosmos-2I 63SM carrier rocket. Upon reaching orbit, the satellite was assigned its Kosmos designation, and received the International Designator 1972-033A. The North American Aerospace Defense Command assigned it the catalogue number 06006.

Kosmos 487 was the fifty-third of seventy nine DS-P1-Yu satellites to be launched, and the forty-eighth of seventy two to successfully reach orbit. It remained in orbit until it decayed and reentered the atmosphere on 24 September 1972.

See also

1972 in spaceflight

References

1972 in spaceflight
Kosmos satellites
Spacecraft launched in 1972
Spacecraft which reentered in 1972
Dnepropetrovsk Sputnik program